The 2004 totesport League season was a 45 over English county cricket competition; colloquially known as the Sunday League. Glamorgan Dragons won the League for the third time.

Final standings

Division One

Division two

References 

Pro40